Marcus Sedatius Severianus (105–161 or 162)

The power of Severianus' wealthy family, the Sedatii, came from trade and commerce. The Sedatii depended on the Loire river, and were known to have had interests in Ostia, the port of Rome. The social and political rise of the Sedatii illustrates the decline of the aristocratic Iulii who had been the leading class in Roman Gaul since the time of the Julio-Claudian dynasty, the first dynasty of Roman emperors. The possible marriage of Severianus' father to Julia Rufina may have been a way of confirming the association between winemakers and land owners in Gaul.

Severianus is known to have had at least one son, Marcus Sedatius Severus Julius Reginus Gallus. All that is known of his son's career is that he was the patron of a college in Ostia. The name Julius Reginus probably came to him from his mother, Severianus' wife. It has been suggested that Severianus was adopted by his father-in-law. If true, this would mean that Sevarianus inherited the name from his mother.

Early career

The first magisterial position which we know Severianus held was that of quaestor of Sicily; he would have supervised the provincial treasury and audited its accounts. Once having served as a quaestor, a man was admitted to the Senate. The political authority of the Senate was negligible, as the Emperor held the true power of the state. Membership of the Senate was sought after by individuals seeking prestige and social standing, rather than executive authority. Severianus probably became a senator late in the reign of Hadrian. He is first mentioned as a senator in inscriptions from Ostia in the 140s. The traditional Republican magistracy of tribune of the plebs followed, another prestigious position which had lost its independence and most of its practical functions. He is also recorded as having been the patron of a city, probably Cadurci (now Cahors) in Gaul. Next he served as a praetor, afterwards commanding the Legio V Macedonica which was stationed in Troesmis in Moesia Inferior on the lower Danube. He was then appointed curator, or overseer, of the Via Flaminia, the major road north from Rome over the Apennines.

Severianus was governor of Roman Dacia and commander of Legio XIII Gemina, which was stationed there, from 151 to 152. This is attested by many inscriptions from Dacia. Two inscriptions from Sarmizegetusa, the capital of Dacia, give his full name and states that he is the patron of the city.The monuments that hold the inscriptions were erected after his consulship. Sarmizegetusa sent a message to Rome to congratulate Severianus and express its gratitude to him for his administration.

In 153 Severianus was appointed consul for part of the year, from July to September, by Emperor Antoninus Pius. A consulship was the highest honour of the Roman state, and candidates were chosen carefully by the emperor. He served alongside Publius Septimius Aper, great-uncle of the future emperor Septimius Severus.

Cappadocia
Severianus is best known as the governor of Cappadocia in the late 150s. The position was important, for Cappadocia was a border province, which is why Severianus, with his military background and experience of frontier provinces, was assigned. Historian Marcel Le Glay suggests that his promotion was due to the support of Publius Mummius Sisenna Rutilianus, the governor of Asia who is famous as a follower of the self-described prophet Alexander of Abonoteichus thanks to the works of Lucian. In Cappadocia, Servianus' actions seem to have been popular: on an inscription from Zela he is honored as the benefactor (Greek: evergetes) and founder (Greek: ktistes) of the city. He also appears on an inscription in Sebastopolis. As governor of Cappadocia Servianus was allocated two legions.

War with Parthia

In the summer of 161, the Parthian Vologases IV invaded Armenia, expelled the ruler Sohaemus placed there by the Romans, and installed his own relative Pacoras as king. Being governor of Cappadocia meant Severianus would be on the front line of any conflict involving Armenia, Alexander of Abonutichus had enraptured Severianus, as he had the proconsul Rutilianus. Alexander convinced Severianus that he could defeat the Parthians easily, and win glory for himself. Severianus led a legion (perhaps the IX Hispana) into Armenia, but was trapped by the Parthian general Chosrhoes at Elegeia, a town just beyond the Cappadocian frontiers, near the headwaters of the Euphrates. Severianus made some attempt to fight Chosrhoes, but soon realized the futility of his campaign, and committed suicide. His legion was massacred. The campaign had only lasted three days. He was replaced as governor of Cappadocia by Marcus Statius Priscus.

Some historians believe that the defeat of Severianus at Elegeia explains the disappearance of the legions XXII Deiotariana and IX Hispana, but no proof exists that could confirm this hypothesis; the fate of the two legions is still controversial.

Aftermath
The governor of Syria was also defeated by the Parthians. Co-Emperor Lucius Verus (he ruled with his adoptive brother Marcus Aurelius) took command against the Parthians and brought in reinforcements on a large scale. These included four whole legions and large detachments from many others. The war ended in a Roman victory five years later, with the capture and sack of the Parthian capital.

Family tree
{| class="collapsible open" style="width:100%"
!colspan= | Family tree of Sedatius

Notes

Inscriptions

References

Bibliography
 
 
Prosopographia Imperii Romani, S 231
 

 

Imperial Roman consuls
2nd-century Gallo-Roman people
Roman governors of Dacia
Roman governors of Cappadocia
Ancient Roman generals
Roman generals killed in action
Sedatii
105 births
160s deaths
Year of birth uncertain
Year of death uncertain